Amy Schumer: Live at the Apollo is an hour-long comedy special from Amy Schumer that premiered on HBO on October 17, 2015. The special was recorded in May 2015 with comedian Chris Rock directing; Rock's work earned a Primetime Emmy nomination for Outstanding Directing for a Variety Special. Amy Schumer: Live at the Apollo also received Primetime Emmy nominations for Outstanding Variety, Music or Comedy Special and Outstanding Writing for a Variety Special. The special also earned a Writers Guild of America nomination.

Reception
Reviewing the special in Paste, Garrett Martin described the topics of Schumer's special as similar to the stand-up clips in her television show Inside Amy Schumer, but "she’s matured as a comedian—she’s able to get bigger and better laughs with material that’s a little bit subtler than in the past." In Slate, Willa Paskin said much of the special was "funny and scathing" but while "Schumer often makes fun of both herself and of gender standards, which can be a cannily self-deprecating way of skewering the status quo...sometimes [this] just seems like an inadvertent upholding of it."

Awards
In 2017, the album was nominated for the Grammy Award for Best Comedy Album at the 59th Annual Grammy Awards.

References

Stand-up comedy concert films
2015 television specials
HBO network specials
Works by Amy Schumer
Live comedy albums
Comedy albums by American artists
Stand-up comedy albums
Spoken word albums by American artists
Live spoken word albums
Live albums by American artists
2010s comedy albums
2015 video albums
2016 live albums
Maverick Records live albums
Films directed by Chris Rock